The Latest Buzz is a Canadian teen sitcom that was created by Brent Piaskoski for Family. In series, a struggling youth magazine, Teen BUZZ, replaces its staff with actual teens. Instead of being in class, five young 14 year-old writers take their last period of the day at the magazine’s office, learning about the fast-paced world of publishing. It premiered on September 1, 2007 and ended on April 19, 2010, with a total of 65 episodes over the course of 3 seasons.

Series overview

Episodes

Season 1 (2007)

Season 2 (2008–09)

Season 3 (2009–10)

References

External links
 

Latest Buzz